Burak Çapkınoğlu (born 25 February 1995) is a Turkish professional footballer who plays as a goalkeeper for Ankaraspor.

Club career
Çapkınoğlu made his professional debut with Gençlerbirliği in a 3-0 Süper Lig loss to Beşiktaş J.K. on 25 July 2020.

References

External links

1995 births
People from Hopa
Living people
Turkish footballers
Association football goalkeepers
Hacettepe S.K. footballers
Gençlerbirliği S.K. footballers
Adanaspor footballers
Ankaraspor footballers
Süper Lig players
TFF First League players
TFF Second League players